Cocoloși is a traditional Romanian dish, consisting of balls of mămăligă (a porridge made out of yellow maize flour) filled with cheese and grilled on a barbecue.

See also 
 Bulz (food)
 Mămăligă în pături
 List of maize dishes

Notes and references 

Romanian dishes
Cheese dishes
Maize dishes